David Rees Rees-Williams, 1st Baron Ogmore, PC, TD (22 November 1903 – 30 August 1976) was a British politician.

Life and career
Rees-Williams was born in Bridgend, Wales, the son of William Rees Williams, of Garth-celyn, Bridgend, and Jennet, daughter of Morgan David, of Bridgend. William Rees Williams was a veterinary surgeon (a Fellow of the Royal College of Veterinary Surgeons), and had served as a Captain in the Royal Army Veterinary Corps. He qualified as a solicitor in 1929. Commissioned into the 6th (Territorial Army) Battalion, Welch Regiment, he was promoted Captain in 1936 and Major in 1938, by which time his battalion had become a searchlight unit. He transferred to the Royal Artillery in 1940, when all searchlight units did so, and ended the Second World War as a Lieutenant-Colonel.

Rees-Williams was elected Labour Member of Parliament for Croydon South in 1945, defeating the incumbent MP, Sir Herbert Williams. In the government he was a minister in the Colonial Office, travelling to East Asia to consider the movements towards independence. His seat was redistributed at the end of the Parliament and he narrowly lost the successor seat at the 1950 general election and was raised to the peerage as Baron Ogmore, of Bridgend in the County of Glamorgan, on 10 July 1950. He served as Minister of Civil Aviation in 1951 and was made a Privy Councillor the same year. Lord Ogmore was President of the London Welsh Trust, which ran the London Welsh Centre, Gray's Inn Road, from 1955 until 1959.

Lord Ogmore joined the Liberal Party in 1959 and served as Liberal Party President, 1963–1964.

In 1930, Lord Ogmore married (Alice Alexandra) Constance, daughter of Walter Robert Wills, Lord Mayor of Cardiff from 1945 to 1946. He had three children. His daughter, Elizabeth Rees-Williams, married the actors Richard Harris and Sir Rex Harrison, the businessman Peter Aitken, and more recently Jonathan Aitken, the former Conservative MP. His grandsons are actors Jared Harris and Jamie Harris and director Damian Harris.

Honours

Foreign honour

  : 
 Agga-Maha-Thayay-Sithu of the Order of the Pyidaungsu Sithu Thingaha (1956)
  : 
 Honorary Commander of the Order of the Defender of the Realm (P.M.N. (K)) - Tan Sri (1959)

References

External links 

1903 births
1976 deaths
20th-century British lawyers
British Army personnel of World War II
Labour Party (UK) MPs for English constituencies
Labour Party (UK) hereditary peers
Liberal Party (UK) hereditary peers
Members of the Privy Council of the United Kingdom
Ministers in the Attlee governments, 1945–1951
People from Bridgend
Politics of the London Borough of Croydon
Presidents of the Liberal Party (UK)
Royal Artillery officers
UK MPs 1945–1950
UK MPs who were granted peerages
Welch Regiment officers
Welsh solicitors
Barons created by George VI